Special School District of St. Louis County (SSD) is a county-wide school district for differently-abled children and for vocational studies in St. Louis County, Missouri. Its headquarters are in Town and Country.

History
It was created in 1957 because county parents wanted their disabled children to be educated; accordingly county residents voted for the creation of the district. Additionally, state-level politicians approved the district's creation. Holly K. Hacker of the St. Louis Post-Dispatch wrote that because disabled children were not guaranteed a public education at the time, the creation of the SSD "was a bold" action.

The district was aiming to fully establish itself circa 1960-1961.

In 1965 it also began establishing career and technical education programs for all residents in the county.

By 1999 the majority of differently abled students received some services from the SSD but were primarily students of local school districts. The differences in operations and scheduling between the entities complicated the education of that group of differently abled students.

Schools
 Special Education Schools
 Ackerman School (Florissant) - Ages 5–14.
 Its students come from the Ferguson-Florissant, Hazelwood, Jennings, and Riverview Gardens school districts.
 Litzsinger School (Ladue) - Ages 5–14.
 Its students come from the Brentwood, Clayton, Kirkwood, Ladue, Maplewood-Richmond Heights, Normandy, Pattonville, Ritenour, and University City school districts. Additionally its service area includes portions of the Parkway and Rockwood school districts.
 Neuwoehner High School (Town and Country) - Ages 14–21.
 Its service area is the same as that of Litzsinger.
 Northview High School (Florissant) - Ages 14–21.
 Its service area is the same as that of Ackerman.
 Southview School (Sunset Hills) - Ages 5–21.
 Its service area is the Affton, Bayless, Hancock Place, Lindbergh, Mehlville, Valley Park, and Webster Groves school districts. Additionally its service area includes portions of the Parkway and Rockwood school districts.

 Career and technical education schools
 North Technical High School (North Tech) (Florissant)
 South Technical High School (South Tech) (Sunset Hills, St. Louis post office address)

References

External links
 Special School District of St. Louis County

School districts in Missouri
Education in St. Louis County, Missouri